Arrochar is a neighborhood in northeastern Staten Island in New York City in the United States.  It is located directly inland of Fort Wadsworth and South Beach, on the east side of Hylan Boulevard south of the Staten Island Expressway; the community of Grasmere borders it on the west. It is today primarily a neighborhood of one- and two-family homes and small businesses.

History
Prior to the arrival of Europeans in the late 17th century to Staten Island, the area was the site of a Lenape encampment. The name "Arrochar" comes from the estate of William Wallace MacFarland in the 1840s, who named it for his hometown of Arrochar in Scotland, the seat of the ancient chiefs of the Clan MacFarlane.

At the beginning of the 20th century the neighborhood became a fashionable gateway to the resort communities of South Beach and Midland Beach.  The house of the MacFarland estate is now part of the grounds of St. Joseph Hill Academy, a Catholic girls school. Across Landis Avenue from St. Joseph Hill Academy sits St. John Villa Academy, a now-defunct all-girls Catholic high school. Throughout the 20th century it became a residential neighborhood for various ethnic groups, Italian-Americans being chief among them.  Arrochar today is still inhabited by many Italians and has a growing Chinese-American community as well.

Education
Arrochar is served by the elementary school P.S.39 and St. Joseph Hill Academy (which is both elementary and high school).

Transportation
Arrochar once had its own train station, on the South Beach Branch of the Staten Island Railway. The station was located at Major Avenue.
This station was abandoned when the SIRT discontinued passenger service on the South Beach Branch to Wentworth Avenue at midnight on March 31, 1953 because of city-operated bus competition. The tracks of the South Beach line have been removed and homes now stand on its former right-of-way.

Due to its proximity to the Verrazanno-Narrows Bridge, Arrochar is served by the  express buses to and from Manhattan; the  buses to and from Brooklyn; and the  intra-borough buses.

See also
List of Staten Island neighborhoods

References

Neighborhoods in Staten Island